Enola is an unincorporated community in Madison County, Nebraska, United States.

History
A post office was established at Enola in 1906, and remained in operation until it was discontinued in 1959. T. J. Malone, Enola's founder, gave the community part of his name spelled backwards.

See also
 List of geographic names derived from anagrams and ananyms

References

Unincorporated communities in Madison County, Nebraska
Unincorporated communities in Nebraska